The 1950 King's Birthday Honours in New Zealand, celebrating the official birthday of King George VI, were appointments made by the King on the advice of the New Zealand government to various orders and honours to reward and highlight good works by New Zealanders. They were announced on 8 June 1950.

The recipients of honours are displayed here as they were styled before their new honour.

Knight Bachelor
 John Andrew Charles Allum  – of Auckland; mayor of the City of Auckland.
 Ernest Herbert Andrews  – of Christchurch; mayor of the City of Christchurch.
 William Appleton – of Wellington; mayor of the City of Wellington.

Order of the Bath

Companion (CB)
Military division
 Commodore Second Class George Walter Gillow Simpson  – Royal Navy.

Order of the British Empire

Commander (CBE)
Civil division
 William James Girling – of Blenheim. For public services, especially in Marlborough Provincial District.
 Gilbert Hutton Grigg – of Hororata. For services to agriculture.
 William Edward Hale – of Maramarua. For services to the dairy industry, particularly as chairman of the New Zealand Dairy Board.
 Arthur Bushby Pearson  – of Christchurch; pathologist to the Christchurch Hospital Board and examiner in the medical school at Otago University for many years.
 William Norman Perry – of Bruntwood. For services to farming, especially as Dominion president of Federated Farmers Incorporated.

Military division
 Brigadier William Henry Blinman Bull   – Royal New Zealand Army Medical Corps.

Officer (OBE)
Civil division
 John William Andrews – of Lower Hutt; mayor of Lower Hutt for 15 years.
 William George Belton – of Waverley; president, Counties Association, and chairman, Patea County Council.
 Thomas Oakley William Brebner – His Majesty's New Zealand consul-general at San Francisco.
 Arthur Francis Brooks Broadhurst – of Cambridge; headmaster, St Peter's School, Cambridge.
 Harold David Caro – of Hamilton; mayor of Hamilton.
 Arthur Edward Flower  – of Fendalton. For services to education.
 Walter Arnold Hadlee – of Christchurch. For services in the field of sport.
 Enoch Bruce Levy – of Palmerston North. For services to agriculture in connection with grassland research.
 Gordon Edward George Minhinnick – of Auckland; a prominent cartoonist.
 Douglas Warren Russell – of Christchurch. For services to ex-servicemen.
 Charles William Tyler – of Rangiora; mayor of Rangiora.

Military division
 Lieutenant-Colonel John Brooke-White – Royal New Zealand Engineers.
 Wing Commander Arthur Beale Greenaway – Royal New Zealand Air Force.

Member (MBE)
Civil division
 Eileen Kate Nesta Adams – of Clevedon; Dominion president, women's section, Federated Farmers Incorporated.
 Alberta Allison Boland – of Waimate. For patriotic and social welfare services.
 Walter John Majendie Bourchier – of Onehunga. For services to ex-servicemen's organisations.
 Elizabeth Coats – of Remuera. For social welfare services.
 John Robin Harris Cooksey – of Rissington, Hawke's Bay; Dominion commissioner for training for boy scouts since 1936.
 Margaret Bain Coutts  – of Paremata. For social welfare services, especially to backward children.
 Randolph James Estall – of Christchurch. For outstanding services as conductor of Woolston Band.
 The Reverend Thomas Halliday – of Auckland; convenor of the Auckland City Metropolitan Relief and Auckland Presbyterian Social Services Association.
 Milly Ruby Hudson – of Dunedin. For social-welfare services.
 John James Henry Lauder – of Auckland; superintendent, His Majesty's Prison, Auckland.
 Fred Purnell  – of Marton; mayor of Marton.
 Wilfrid Dalton Shelton – of Gore. For municipal and patriotic services.
 James Cleland Hall Somerville – of Dunedin. For services to the School Committees' Association and the Otago Boys' High School board.
 Morris Stewart Spence – of Napier; president, Hawke's Bay Art Gallery and Museum.
 The Reverend Canon Paora Temuera – of Ōtaki. For services to the Māori people.
 Clifford Simeon Thompson – of Christchurch; treasurer, Canterbury School Committees' Association.

Military division
 Archibald Bazil Cox – Temporary Senior Commissioned Gunner, Royal New Zealand Navy.
 Warrant Officer 2nd Class James John Bergman – Royal New Zealand Armoured Corps.
 Major Hubert Waters Jacka – Royal New Zealand Engineers.
 Captain Reginald Frederick Joyce – New Zealand Regiment.
 Flight Lieutenant Ronald Arthur Manners – Royal New Zealand Air Force.

British Empire Medal (BEM)
Military division
 Chief Petty Officer Telegraphist Adrian Frederick Bywater Lutman – Royal New Zealand Navy.
 Petty Officer Leonard Fullerton – Royal New Zealand Naval Volunteer Reserve.
 Staff Sergeant (temporary Warrant Officer 2nd Class) David James Abel – New Zealand Army.
 Sergeant George Eltringham – Royal New Zealand Army Medical Corps.
 Sergeant David John Caughley – Royal New Zealand Air Force.

Air Force Cross (AFC)
 Squadron Leader Reginald Yates Powell  – Royal Air Force.

References

Birthday Honours
1950 awards
1950 in New Zealand
New Zealand awards